Erumamunda is a small village located near Nilambur in Malappuram district of Kerala, India. It is situated in chungathara grama panchayath. Erumamunda includes 1st and 20th ward of Chungathara panchayath. currently the ward members are Mr. Libin Baby and Ms. Sainaba teacher respectively for 1st and 20th ward. It is situated river side of Chaliyar River and western ghats. 70% of the local people are directly or indirectly working with rubber products and rest of them are working abroad, Govt job and doing other professions. The main source of income of the people is from rubber or latex related industries. There is a Higher Secondary School called Nirmala Higher Secondary School. The school has contributed immensely for the educational development of erumamunda and near by villages. Erumamunda is one of the highly developed village in chungathara panchayath and Nilambur municipality.

Kurumbalangode Village office situated here. A homeo dispensary is working here. There is Telephone Exchange. It is very close to Adyan Para waterfalls a famous picnic spot in this area.

Culture
Erumamunda has almost equal number of Muslim, Hindu and Christians. So the culture of the locality is based upon above religious traditions. Thiruvathira,  Duff Muttu, Kolkali, Margamkali and Aravanamuttu are common folk arts of this locality.

Transportation
Erumamunda village connects to other parts of Malappuram.

Main roads are Adiyanpara - Kaippini - Chungathara Road (AC Road), Akampadam - Pathar Road, Vellimuttam - Kurumbalangode Road, Pulikakkadu Road, Chempankolly - Matha Road. Kallayipara Road etc.

Nearest Railway station is Nilambur Road Railway station operating trains between Nilambur and Thiruvanthapuram, Palakkad, Shoranur, Kottayam, Cochin, Thrissur etc.

Nearest airport is Calicut International Airport, Malappuram is 50Km away.

Nearest state highway is Gudallur - Nilambur - Kozhikode Road is 9 Km away.

Nearest National Highway is Feroke - Malappuram - Palakkad Highway passing through Malappuram

References

Villages in Malappuram district
Nilambur area